Steven Chong Horng Siong  (born 22 September 1957) is a Singaporean judge who has been serving as a judge of the Court of Appeal of Singapore since 2017. He had previously served as the seventh attorney-general of Singapore between 2012 and 2014, and a judge of the High Court of Singapore between 2010 and 2012, and again between 2014 and 2017.

Early life
Chong graduated from the National University of Singapore with a Bachelor of Laws degree in 1982. 

In that same year, Chong, together with Davinder Singh, V. K. Rajah and Jimmy Yim, won the Philip C. Jessup Cup. 

Chong was admitted as an advocate and solicitor of the Supreme Court in 1983. He was appointed Senior Counsel in January 1998, Judicial Commissioner in October 2009 and Supreme Court Judge in June 2010.

Career
Chong started his legal practice at Drew & Napier, where he spent 14 years and built up his legal career from an associate to the joint Managing Partner. He then spent 12 years in Rajah & Tann and was its Senior Partner and then Managing Partner until his appointment to the Supreme Court Bench. He was a leading commercial lawyer during his practice and argued many cases in court. He was also a senior member of the Singapore arbitration community and participated in arbitration as both a counsel as well as an arbitrator. He is an accredited Arbitrator of the Singapore International Arbitration Centre and the Singapore Chamber of Maritime Arbitration. Chong was also Iceland's Honorary Consul to Singapore from 2003 to 2009.

Chong was appointed Attorney-General on 25 June 2012, succeeding Sundaresh Menon. In April 2014 it was announced that he would return to Singapore's High Court at the conclusion of his two-year term, to be succeeded by Judge of Appeal V. K. Rajah.

References

External links
Attorney-General's Chambers factsheet on the appointment of Justice Steven Chong as Attorney-General
Steven Chong's profile at Rajah & Tann LLP

Singaporean people of Chinese descent
Anglo-Chinese School alumni
Living people
National University of Singapore alumni
20th-century Singaporean lawyers
Singaporean people of Hakka descent
Singaporean Senior Counsel
Attorneys-General of Singapore
Singaporean Judges of Appeal
1957 births
21st-century Singaporean lawyers